The American Wrestling Association (AWA) World Tag Team Championship was a professional wrestling world tag team championship in the American Wrestling Association from 1960 until the promotion folded in 1991.

History 
When the NWA Minneapolis Wrestling and Boxing Club operated by Verne Gagne withdrew from the National Wrestling Alliance in May 1960, Stan Kowalski and Tiny Mills were the recognized champions of the NWA World Tag Team Championship (Minneapolis version). At the time, the AWA continued to recognize the NWA champions as their World champions. However, by August 1960, and having recently recaptured the NWA Tag Team championships for a second time, Kowalski and Mills were recognized as the first AWA World Tag Team Champions when AWA stopped recognizing NWA champions.

As the promotion grew, the AWA World Tag Team Championship became one of the most coveted tag team titles in the United States from the beginning until the late 1980s, when the AWA's talent roster was depleted by the World Wrestling Federation and Jim Crockett Promotions. This led to the retirement of the titles when the AWA closed.

Title history

List of top combined reigns

By team

By wrestler

Footnotes

References

External links
AWA World Tag Team Title History

American Wrestling Association championships
Tag team wrestling championships
World professional wrestling championships